Duya is a town in Zalun Township of Hinthada District in the Ayeyarwady Region of south-western Burma (Myanmar). Duya is located on the west side of Duya Lake, an oxbow lake of the Irrawaddy.

Notes

External links
 "Duya Map — Satellite Images of Duya" Maplandia World Gazetteer

Populated places in Ayeyarwady Region